KIDO (580 AM) is a commercial radio station, owned and operated by Townsquare Media, which broadcasts a news/talk format. Licensed to Nampa, Idaho, it serves the Boise metropolitan area.

KIDO's studios are located at 827 East Park Blvd. in Boise, in the same building as co-owned 630 KFXD, 103.3 KSAS-FM, 104.3 KAWO, 105.9 KCIX, and 107.9 KXLT-FM. The transmitter site is on West Amity Road in Meridian, Idaho. KIDO operates with 5,000 watts around the clock. By day, the signal is non-directional, but at night, to protect other stations on 580 kHz, KIDO broadcasts a directional signal.

Programming
KIDO has a local wake up program, with nationally syndicated talk shows the rest of the day. Weekdays start at 5 a.m. with Kevin Miller in The Morning featuring local news and interviews. At 9 a.m. Glenn Beck is heard, followed by Dave Ramsey at noon. At 3 p.m., it's Sean Hannity followed by Lars Larson at 6 p.m. and Ground Zero with Clyde Lewis at 9 p.m. Beginning at 11 p.m. and running all night, it's Coast to Coast AM with George Noory.

Weekends feature shows on money, real estate, gardening, firearms, farming and ranching. Computer expert Kim Komando and Somewhere in Time with Art Bell are heard. Some weekday shows are repeated and paid brokered programming also airs.

History

KIDO's first license was granted on September 2, 1925, with the sequentially assigned call letters of KFXD, to L. H. Strong (Packard Motor Co.) in Logan, Utah, transmitting on 1460 kHz. In early 1926, station ownership was transferred to the Service Radio Corporation, still in Logan. In early 1927 KFXD's license was allowed to lapse, but a few months it was relicensed to Service Radio, although now located in Jerome, Idaho, and broadcasting on 1470 kHz.

KFXD moved to its current location of Nampa, Idaho in mid-1930.

For three weeks in February 1998 the call letters were changed to KBKK, before returning to KFXD.

2002 KIDO / KFXD call letter swap

On August 14, 2002, stations KIDO and KFXD exchanged call signs, with AM 580 becoming KIDO, and AM 630 assigned the KFXD call letters by the Federal Communications Commission (FCC). Although for the general listening public this resulted in the two familiar call signs appearing on new dial positions, the FCC generally traces station identities by individual facilities rather than call signs. Thus, it was noted at the time that "As far as the FCC is concerned, this was not a frequency change at all. KIDO on 580 is the same station that used to be KFXD on 580 - the only thing that changed were the call letters. Likewise for KFXD on 630; it is the same station that was KIDO-630."

On November 16, 2006, Clear Channel Communications planned to sell 448 of its radio stations outside the top 100 markets including KIDO, along with Boise's sister stations including KSAS-FM, KCIX, KTMY (now KAWO), KXLT-FM and KFXD. In March 2007, Peak Broadcasting LLC bought the latter stations, making Boise one of the largest markets without any radio stations owned by the future iHeartMedia.

For 2011, KIDO announced it would become an affiliate for the BYU Cougars Sports Network.

On August 30, 2013, it was announced that Townsquare Media would purchase Peak Broadcasting's stations, including KIDO. The transaction was part of Cumulus Media's acquisition of Dial Global; with Townsquare swapping Peak's Fresno, California stations to Cumulus for its stations in Dubuque, Iowa and Poughkeepsie, New York, with Peak, Townsquare, and Dial Global all controlled by Oaktree Capital Management. The sale to Townsquare was completed on November 14, 2013.

References

External links
KIDO Website

FCC History Cards for KIDO (covering 1927-1981 as KFXD)

IDO
News and talk radio stations in the United States
Radio stations established in 1925
1925 establishments in Utah
Townsquare Media radio stations